Vardar, also known as Axios, is a river in North Macedonia and Greece.

Vardar may also refer to:

People
Ahmet Vardar, Turkish journalist
Akın Vardar, Turkish footballer
Emel Vardar, Turkish artist
Sertan Vardar, Turkish football player

Places
Vardar Banovina, a province of the Kingdom of Yugoslavia between 1929 and 1941
Vardar Macedonia, an area in the north of the Macedonia region
Vardar Metro Station, Sofia, Bulgaria
Vardar Statistical Region
Vardar Yenicesi or Giannitsa, a town and a former municipality in Pella regional unit, Greece

Sports
FK Vardar, a football club in Skopje, Republic of Macedonia
KK Vardar, a basketball club in Skopje, Republic of Macedonia
RK Vardar, a men's handball club in Skopje, Republic of Macedonia
ŽRK Vardar, a women's handball club in Skopje, Republic of Macedonia

Other uses
Lower Vardar dialect, a South Slavic dialect
Vardar Army, Ottoman Empire

See also
Axios (disambiguation)

Turkish-language surnames